Suzhal is a 2012 Indian Tamil language thriller film directed by Jayan R. Krishna and starring Atul Kulkarni, Fariz and Prathap K. Pothan. It was released on 27 July 2012.

Cast
Atul Kulkarni
Fariz
Hemachandran
Prathap K. Pothan as Mathews
Nizhalgal Ravi
Kadhal Sukumar
Charu
Rosaline
Jyothi
Hareesh Peradi
Poly Varghese

Production
Director R. Jayakumar had been associated with theatre scene in Chennai since the early 1990s and opted to make his directorial debut with editor B. Lenin's guidance. Atul Kulkarni was signed to play a key role along with 10 newcomers, including Fariz, who played the main lead. The film was shot for ten days on a ship heading towards Lakshadweep.

Soundtrack
The music was composed by L. Vaidyanathan's son Ganesh, who did the rerecording for Pesum Padam (1987).
Yaar Yaaro - Raja Hasan
Solla Vandhen - Hariharan, Sadhana Sargam
Vaa Nanba Vaa - Benny Dayal, Suvi Suresh
Aadum Alai Mele - Suvi Suresh
Mercury - Blaze, L. V. Muthukumarasamy, Prashanthini

Reception
The film was released on 27 July 2012 across Tamil Nadu. A review from The New Indian Express wrote "an interesting tale, if only it was original. A straight lift of the chilling French thriller 13 Tzameti (2005), the film faithfully followed the original with only minor changes for nativity." A reviewer from Times of India wrote "both the script and its execution are immature to say the least and what should have been a tense cat-and-mouse game ends up as a joke that tests your patience."

A critic from Behindwoods.com noted "overall you feel that the script should have been a little tighter and the first half should have been better." Critic Rohit Ramachandran from Nowrunning stated that "A pointless first half with nothing to offer takes us to a remarkably gripping second half".

Box office 
The film had a below average run at the Chennai box office, but Atul Kulkarni claimed that the film did well.

References

External links

2012 films
2012 drama films
Indian drama films
2010s Tamil-language films